Rawlathus Saliheen Ahadhiya (Daham) School is an Islamic Ahadiya school founded in 1992 under the guidance of All Island Ahadhiya School Federation in Sri Lanka and registered under The Department of Muslim Religious and Cultural Affairs (MRCA). It is situated Gampaha District in Mabola, Wattala. From grades 1-11, classes are conducted in Sinhala, Tamil, and English languages. Currently administrated by the Ministry of Muslim Religious & Cultural Affairs & Postal.

Motto
According to a hadith of Muhammad, he said, "Seek knowledge from the cradle to the grave". Rawlathus Saliheen set the above statement of Muhammad as its motto.

History
The school was initiated on 16 March 1992 unofficially accommodating 25 students with 04 teachers. This was set in a straw thatch with the participation of villagers. Unfortunately, this thatch was set fire by an unknown person in the month of August which brought a tragic end for the studies. By the unwavering courage of the founder Mr.M.S.M.Nasoordeen, the school was reestablished by replacing the burnt thatch with a stone building by the patronage of scholar Al-Haj Faleel Moulavi, the police and the villagers.

The school was officially opened on 06th of September 1992 (08th of Rabi-ul-Awwal 1413 A.H.). Since 1992 up to date it is successfully functioning with revision of the curriculum and upgrades in the structure.

Ahadhiya School Anthem
Fear our Lord Allah, Every Day
His Command and His wish let's obey
Whatever should happen let us say
It is all His will, come what may

Our Prophet of this world and the next
His example, let us not forsake
Let's rejoice, be carefree and content
Whatever sacrifice we'd have to make

To us who live in this land
Make our lives sublime and bright
Ya Allah bless us with knowledge
Shower thy mercy, compassion and might

Let's be thankful for our noble religion
Hold fast unto it sincerely
In all its serenity and glory
Let's indulge in Thakbeer constantly

Like a lamp shining in the deepest darkness
Let us spread Islam in all its light
May the Ahadhiya Movement in our homeland
Rise with Iman to the highest

Symbolism of the Emblem
The upper calligraphy Arabian text states Bismillahir Rahmanir Raheem, (In the name of Allah, the Most Gracious, the Most Merciful). The lower Arabian calligraphy text states La Ilaha Illallah Muhammadur Rasoolullah (There is no God but Allah, prophet Muhammad is the Messenger of Allah). The italic texts states our school motto. The crescent and the side way stars symbolizes the progress and light respectively. The middle depicts the Ka'bah (House of Allah),(Qiblah) the prayer direction of the whole world.

Administration

 M.S.M. Nasoordeen - Principal 
 M.R.M. Hakeem - Gen. Secretary & Head of Academic Affairs & Examinations
 A.G.Z. Munawwara - Vice Principal & Head of Administration

Sectional Arrangements
 Kindergarten Section - Rawlathul Athfaal (Ages 4 – 5)
 Primary section           ( Grades 1 - 3)
 Junior Section            ( Grades 4 - 6)
 Junior Intermediate       ( Grades 7 - 9)
 Senior Section            ( Grades 10 & 11)

Subjects
 Tharbiyyah Islamia (Islamic Morals)
 Al Quran & Sunnah
 Seera and Thariq (Islamic Biographies & History)
 Fiqhul Islam (Islamic Jurisprudence)
 Al Akhlaq (Islamic Ethics)
 Aqidha and Masadhirush Shariah (Islamic Principles and Legal Sources)

Examinations and governing bodies
 National Level Examination for Preliminary Ahahdhiya School - Dept.of Muslim Religious & Cultural Affairs
 Ahadhiya Intermediate Examination - Central Federation of Ahadhiya Schools in Sri Lanka
 Final Certificate Examination for Ahadhiya School - Dept. of Examinations - Sri Lanka (National Evaluation & Testing Service)
 Islamic Deeniyyath (Dharmacharya) Examination - Dept. of Examinations - Sri Lanka (National Evaluation & Testing Service)
 Al Alim Certificate Examination - Dept. of Examinations - Sri Lanka (National Evaluation & Testing Service)

Provincial schools in Sri Lanka
Schools in Gampaha District
1992 establishments in Sri Lanka
Educational institutions established in 1992